Türkmengaz is the national gas company of Turkmenistan. From January to November 2020, Türkmengaz had US$4.13bn in revenue. It is the largest gas company in Central Asia. The chairman of the company, with rank of minister of state, is Batyr Amangeldiyevich Amanov.

Türkmengaz in 2018 opened the Kiyanly petrochemical complex for production of polymers. It has the capacity to produce 381,000 tonnes of polyethylene and 81,000 tonnes of polypropylene per year.

See also

  Economy of Turkmenistan § Natural gas
 Malai Gas Field
 Türkmennebit

References

Oil and gas companies of Turkmenistan
National oil and gas companies
Energy companies established in 1997